The South Magwa Oil Field is an oil field located in the Great Burgan. It was discovered in 1984 and developed by Kuwait Oil Company. The oil field is operated and owned by Kuwait Oil Company.

References 

Oil fields of Kuwait